Union Properties is a real estate development company based in Dubai, United Arab Emirates. The company was formed in 1987 as Union Property Private Limited and was listed on the Dubai Financial Market in 1993. Previous projects include The Index apartment/office building in Dubai and Dubai Motor City.

Previous developments 

 Dubai Motor City neighborhood located in Dubai (city). Union Properties has participated in developing its related subprojects including, mosques, Uptown-MotorCity, MotorCity-Green Community, The Ribbon and OIA Residence, Dubai Autodrome, the Grandstand Retail Plaza, the Motorsport Business Park, a VIP Paddock Hospitality area and entertainment facilities for events and corporate entertainment.
 Dubai Green Community, DIP has been developed by a joint venture created between Union Properties and Dubai Investments PJSC called Properties Investment LLC. This project includes the development of Courtyard by Marriott Green Community, Green Community Phase I, Green Community West, Phase II, The Market and Green Community West, Phase III (completed in July 2018).
 Union Tower, 1996, in Dubai
 'Al Mussalla Towers, 1998, in Dubai
 
 Union Properties Tower, 2002, in Dubai
 The Index (Dubai) tower, 2005, in Dubai
 Control Tower, 2008, in Dubai
 Limestone House, Dubai International Financial Centre

 The Ritz-Carlton, Dubai International Financial Centre
 UPTOWN Mirdiff, Dubai
 Union House, Dubai
OIA Residence, Dubai Motor City
 Marriott Executive Apartments, Dubai
 Creekside Residence, Dubai
 Opal Building, Dubai
 Al Satwa Villas, Dubai
 Al Wasl Villas, Dubai
 Jumeirah Park Villas, Dubai
 Radio Tower Villas, Dubai
 Al Loze Villas, Dubai
 Nadd Rashid Villas, Dubai
 Union House, Dubai
 Net.Com, Dubai
 Al Rolla Building, Dubai
 Al Etihad Cold Storage, Dubai

Subsidiaries 

 Dubai Motor City
 Dubai Autodrome
 ServeU
 EDACOM
 The FitOut
 Property Investment
 GMAMCO
 Union Malls
 Uptown Mirdiff

 UPP Capital Investment
 Union Holding LLC
 Al Etihad Cold Storage LLC
 Thermo LLC

Board of directors
The Chairman is Mr. Khalifa Hasan Ali Saleh Al Hammadi, & Vice Chairman is Mr. Fathi Ben Abdul Sattar Ben Grira.

Board Members are:
 Mohamed Fardan Ali Al Fardan
 Darwish Abdulla Ahmed Al Ketbi
 Dahi Yousef Ahmed Abdulla Al Mansoori
 Abdul Wahab Al Halabi
 Jorg Klar

Prizes & Awards 

 Arabian Business Award 2005, as Property Company of the Year, organised by the Arabia Business Magazine (ITP).
 2005–2007 The Middle East Autocar Awards 2005.
 Emirates Superbrand Award 2009
 Best Tall Building Middle East & Africa in 2011 for Index Tower, a project of UP, organized by The Council on Tall Buildings and Urban Habitat.
 Top Real Estate Companies 2016 in 13th grade, organised by Forbes Middle East.
 2018, Nasser bin Butti Omair bin Yousef, chairman of Union Properties, was recognized in 8th place on the Power 60 list by Construction Business News.
 2018, “Chairman of the year” award to Nasser Butti Omair Bin Yousef, chairman of Union Properties, by CEO middle east publication.
 Top 100 Companies in the Middle East 2018 in 47th grade organized by Forbes Middle East.
 Gary Reader, ServeU General Manager won FM Executive of the Year 2020 award from FM Middle East Awards.
 ServeU won Unsung Hero of the Year 2020 award from FM Middle East Awards.
 Best Real Estate Company 2016 in thirteenth grade, organized by Forbes Middle East.
 Awarded as “Best Tall Building Middle East & Africa” from the Council on Tall Buildings and Urban Habitat in 2011.

Selling Emicool Assets 
On January 21, 2018, Union Properties announced that it had sold to Dubai Investment, the multi-investment company, listed on the Dubai Financial Market, its stake of 50% in « Emirates District Cooling LLC » “EMICOOL” for 500 million Dirhams. After this acquisition, Dubai Investments will acquire all shares of EMICOOL 100%. The proceeds of the sale contributed to the enhancement of the activities of the Union Properties and the restructuring of some debts arising from the company. 

Union Properties also invested another part in purchasing a strategic stake in Palm Hills Company in Egypt according to the company's financial data for the year 2019 and these returns contributed to the restoration of Stability of the company's cash flow and contribute to revitalizing and focusing on the company's other business, in addition to enhancing the company's financial position and allowing it to complete its other major business.

Sponsoring 

 Dubai Motor City Sponsored the AUTOCAR Middle East Awards 2007، Honoring the industry professionals, for 3 years.
 Uptown Mirdiff Chess and Bridge Championship 2017.
 Open a race track in Dubai Autodrome for people to practice driving fast in a safe area for free once weekly.

References 

Property companies of the United Arab Emirates
Real estate companies established in 1987